The grey seedeater (Sporophila intermedia) is a species of bird in the family Thraupidae.
It is found in Brazil, Colombia, Ecuador, Guyana, Trinidad and Tobago, and Venezuela.
Its natural habitats are subtropical or tropical seasonally wet or flooded lowland grassland and heavily degraded former forest.

References

grey seedeater
Birds of Colombia
Birds of Venezuela
Birds of Trinidad and Tobago
grey seedeater
Taxonomy articles created by Polbot